

Storms
Note:  indicates the name was retired after that usage in the respective basin

 Iadine (1981) – made landfall in Madagascar.

 Ian
 1982 – a Category 3 severe tropical cyclone (Australian scale) which influenced Western Australia.
 1987 – no threat to land.
 1992 – impacted Western Australia.
 1996  – approached Japan.
 1997 – remained over open waters.
 2014 – impacted Tonga.
 2016 – tropical storm in the central Atlantic Ocean that never affected land.
 2022 – destructive Category 4 hurricane, impacted Cuba, Southeastern United States, and portions of South Carolina and North Carolina.

 Iana (1989) – passed through Madagascar as a tropical storm.

 Ianos (2020) – powerful and rare Medicane that impacted Greece in September 2020.

 Iarima (1986) – formed south-southeast of Diego Garcia; did not affect any landmass.

 Iarisena (1988) – did not affect land.

 Iba (2019) – first tropical storm in the South Atlantic since Anita of 2010.

 Ida
 1945 – struck Japan; known as the Makurazaki typhoon.
 1950 – not areas land.
 1954 – was the strongest storm of 1954, and made landfall in China.
 1958 – sixth-deadliest typhoon to hit Japan and one of the strongest cyclones on record; struck Japan and was also known as the Kanogawa typhoon.
 1961 – struck Japan.
 1964 – struck northeastern Luzon and southeastern China near Hong Kong.
 1966 – struck Japan.
 1968 – affected Réunion.
 1969 – not areas land.
 1971 – in the Coral Sea, never threatened land.
 1972 (May) – near the Solomon Islands causing $70 million in damage.
 1972 (September) – no areas land.
 1975 – a category 2 typhoon, recurved out to sea.
 1980 – passed south of Taiwan and moved ashore in China just north of Hong Kong.
 1983 – a small cyclone, no damage occurred within Japan.
 1986 – made landfall in the Philippines.
 2009 – a late-season hurricane that struck Nicaragua and later the United States Gulf Coast as an extratropical cyclone, which helped form a nor'easter that affected the Northeast United States; Ida caused four deaths and $11.4 million in damage.
 2015 – a weak but long-lived tropical storm in the eastern Atlantic Ocean.
 2021 - devastating Category 4 hurricane that made landfall on the same day as Hurricane Katrina; caused ≥$75.2 billion (USD) in damages and 107 deaths.

 Idai (2019) – powerful SWIO cyclone that made landfall in Madagascar and Mozambique; deadliest cyclone on record in the basin.

 Idylle (1979) – crossed to the Australian Region on April 13; stayed out at sea for most of its life.

 Iggy (2012) – affected Indonesia and Western Australia.

 Igme
 2004 – a powerful storm that affected the Philippines, Taiwan, and China.
 2008 – made landfall in Taiwan as a Category 2 typhoon.
 2012 – affected South Korea due to an interaction with Typhoon Bolaven.
 2016 – powerful typhoon that made landfall in South Korea.
 2020 – affected South Korea, but made landfall in North Korea.

 Ignacio
 1979 - made landfall on the western coast of Mexico as a tropical depression; caused no impacts
 1985 - affected Hawaii; however, it had little impact on the land area. 
 1991 - affected the Mexican coastline with heavy rains
 1997 - affected southwestern California as a post-tropical cyclone.
 2003 - latest-forming first hurricane in the Eastern Pacific; made landfall in Baja California.
 2009 - did not affect land.
 2015 - did not affect land
 2021 - a short-lived cyclone that did not affect land.

 Igor (2010) – a powerful hurricane that struck Newfoundland, causing one death and C$200  million in damage, the costliest in the island's history; Igor also produced high waves that killed three people.

 Ikala (2002) – did not affect land.

 Ike
 1981 – tropical storm that struck Taiwan and affected the Philippines, killing 8 people.
 1984 – a powerful typhoon that struck the Philippine island of Mindanao and later southern China, causing 1,474 deaths and $230 million in damage.
 2008 – a powerful hurricane that struck Turks and Caicos, the Bahamas, Cuba, and Texas, causing 214  deaths and $38  billion in damage.

 Ikola (2015) – crossed to the Australian region on April 6; did not affect land.

 Ikonjo (1990) – rare storm that affected Seychelles.

 Ileana
 1994 –  a Category 1 hurricane that affected the Baja California Peninsula.
 2000 – affected the coast of Mexico.
 2006 – a Category 3 hurricane that briefly threatened Mexico but turned away.
 2012 –  a Category 1 hurricane that did not affect land.
 2018 – briefly affected the coast of Mexico, before being absorbed by Hurricane John.

 Iletta (1997) – did not affect land.

 Ilona (1988) – a severe tropical cyclone that caused moderate damage across the Pilbara region of Western Australia in 1988.

 Ilsa
 1958 – Category 2 hurricane that stayed out at sea, interacted with Helene.
 1967 – stayed out at sea.
 1971 – a major hurricane that stayed out at sea.
 1975 – stayed out at sea; remnants contributed to the formation of an unnamed hurricane that existed from late August to early September.
 1999 – cyclone that made landfall as a Category 1 cyclone (AUS scale) in Western Australia.
 2009 – powerful cyclone that stayed out at sea.

 Ima (1986) – affected French Polynesia, causing extensive damage to Rimatara.

 Iman (2021) – made landfall in Mozambique as a tropical depression

 Imani (2010) – did not affect any land areas while moving southwards.

 Imboa (1984) – long-lived system that affected Madagascar and Mozambique.

 Imbudo (2003) – intense typhoon that made landfall in Northern Philippines and China.

 Imelda
 2013 – did not affect land.
 2019 – the tropical storm that was the fifth-wettest overall in the contiguous United States.

 Imogen (2021) – a Category 1 tropical cyclone that affected Northern Australia.

 In-fa
 2015 – formed southeast of Kosrae; did not affect land.
 2021 – Category 2 typhoon, made landfalls in the Putuo District of Zhoushan and Pinghu, China.

 Inday
 2002 – affected Guam a week after Typhoon Chataan made landfall and caused heavy damage.
 2006 – affected Taiwan.
 2010 – typhoon that made landfall in Taiwan and China, causing $1 billion (USD) in damages and 105 deaths.
 2014 – a long-lived system that caused heavy rains over Japan and South Korea.
 2018 – affected the Ryukyu Islands and made landfall in China, leaving 1 dead and $241 million in damages.
 2022 – the most powerful typhoon to hit Shanghai since Typhoon Gloria in 1949.

 Indlala (2007) – powerful tropical cyclone that made landfall in Antalaha, Madagascar.

 Ineng
 2003 – only recognized by JTWC.
 2007 – struck Taiwan and China.
 2011 – struck Japan.
 2015 – affected Korea and struck Japan; although causing P1 billion in damages, it was not retired by PAGASA.
 2019 – affected Taiwan and China.

 Ines (1975) – affected Madagascar.

 Inez
 1947 – a category 3 typhoon, affected Taiwan and China.
 1966 – a powerful major hurricane that affected the Caribbean, Bahamas, Florida, and Mexico in 1966.

 Ingrid
 1946 – struck the Philippines and southern China.
 1964 – short-lived cyclone that moved southeastward over the Indian Ocean.
 1970 – struck Western Australia.
 1984 – tropical cyclone off the northeast coast of Queensland.
 1995 – passed between Mauritius and Rodrigues and proceeded southward through the Indian Ocean.
 2005 – a powerful cyclone that struck Queensland, Northern Territory, and Western Australia, causing five deaths and $14.4 million in damage.
 2007 – short-lived tropical storm east of the Lesser Antilles.
 2013 – minimal hurricane that struck eastern Mexico at the same time Manuel affected the country's west coast; Ingrid caused 32 deaths and $1.5 billion in damage.

 Inigo – a 2003 cyclone that struck Indonesia and tied with Cyclone Gwenda for being the most intense recorded cyclone in the Australian region in terms of pressure, with the possible exception of Cyclone Mahina.

 Iniki (1992) – most powerful hurricane to strike Hawaii on record; third-costliest United States hurricane at the time.

 Innis
 1992 – briefly threatened Vanuatu.
 2009 – passed through Vanuatu, New Caledonia, and New Zealand as a weak cyclone.

 Innocente (2000) – produced heavy rainfall to Mauritius.

 Io (1977) – (As Jack) crossed into the South-west Indian Ocean, renamed Io; stayed out at sea.

 Ioke (2006) – fifth-most intense Pacific hurricane on record, also known as Typhoon Ioke in the Western Pacific.

 Ione
 1948 – made landfall in Japan.
 1955 – moved over eastern North Carolina as a minimal hurricane, causing further damage in the state after hurricanes Connie and Diane earlier that year.
 1966 – affected Mexico.
 1970 (July #1) – did not make landfall.
 1970 (July #2) – did not make landfall.
 1974 – stayed out at sea.

 Ionia (1993) – affected Mozambique and Madagascar.

Iota (2020) – a devastating late-season Category 4 Atlantic hurricane which caused severe damage to areas of Central America already devastated by Hurricane Eta just less than two weeks prior.

 Iphigenie (1971) – stayed out at sea.

 Ira
 1990 – struck Vietnam.
 1993 – struck the Philippines

 Irah
 1963 – a weak tropical storm, hit on Hawaii as a tropical depression.
 1968 – did not make landfall.
 1979 – a category 2 hurricane made landfall on Baja California and entered the Gulf of California as a tropical storm, making landfall again in northwestern Mexico.

 Irena (1978) – affected Madagascar

 Irene
 1947 – late-season tropical storm that moved through the Philippines.
 1953 – off-season tropical storm which never made landfall.
 1959 – dropped heavy rainfall when it struck the Florida panhandle as a minimal tropical storm.
 1963 – struck Madagascar shortly before dissipating.
 1969 – did not make landfall.
 1971 – low-latitude hurricane that crossed Nicaragua, killing three people; was renamed Hurricane Olivia upon reaching the eastern Pacific Ocean.
 1977 – skirted the northern coast of Western Australia, but ultimately affected no land areas.
 1981 – major hurricane that traversed the Atlantic Ocean, affecting France as an extratropical cyclone.
 1999 – slow-moving hurricane that struck Cuba and Florida, causing 18 deaths and $800 million in damage.
 2005 – hurricane that passed between North Carolina and Bermuda, generating high surf that killed one person.
 2011 – Category 3 hurricane that moved from the Caribbean to North Carolina and New England, causing 57 deaths and $14.2 billion in damage.
 2023 – a category 2 tropical cyclone affected Vanuatu and New Caledonia.

 Irina (2012) – cyclone that brought gusty winds to Madagascar, Mozambique and South Africa; claimed 77 lives.

 Iris
 1951 – a Category 5 made landfall in the Philippines, the typhoon caused nine fatalities and injured an additional 39 people.
 1955 – Category 1 hit Taiwan and China.
 1959 – a catastrophic tropical cyclone that killed as many as 2,334 people in China.
 1962 – five deaths reported and no estimated damage to crops on the islands.
 1964 – Category 1 which struck Vietnam.
 1965 – tropical storm that struck Madagascar.
 1967 – a weak tropical storm hit China.
 1970 – Category 3 the first typhoon to develop over the South China Sea in October since 1957.
 1973 – Category 2 made landfall South Korea.
 1976 – Category 1 meandered over the South China Sea and struck South China.
 1989 – tropical storm that dissipated in the outflow of Hurricane Hugo.
 1995 – crossed over the Lesser Antilles, causing four deaths on Martinique, later reached Europe as a strong extratropical storm.
 1999 – did not make landfall.
 2000 – a category 3 tropical cyclone (australian scale) impact Fiji.
 2001 – struck Belize as a Category 4 storm, killing several in Central America, including 20 on a ship that capsized off the coast, and caused $66 million in damage to Belize.
 2018 – a Category 2 tropical cyclone (Australian scale), did not make landfall.

 Irma
 1949 – a weak tropical storm that affected Taiwan.
 1953 – a powerful Category 3 typhoon that weakened before reaching the coast of the Philippines.
 1957 – brought torrential rains and high winds to Vietnam, resulting in nine fatalities and an estimated $2 million in damage.
 1960 – tropical depression that passed the northern coast of the Philippines.
 1963 – did not make landfall.
 1966 – strong typhoon that made landfall in the Philippines.
 1967 – did not make landfall.
 1968 – a category 1 tropical cyclone; stayed out at sea.
 1971 – tenth-most intense Pacific typhoon on record; stayed out at sea for most of its life.
 1974 – the last of the year's 8 typhoons to hit the Philippines.
 September 1978 – short-lived typhoon that made landfall in Taiwan then Japan as a tropical storm.
 October 1978 – short-lived tropical storm that passed over the Azores.
 1981 – powerful typhoon that made landfall in the Philippines, causing $63.3 million in damages and 595 deaths.
 1985 – made landfall in Japan as a typhoon.
 1987 – cyclone that made landfall in the Northern Territory as a Category 2 in the AUS scale.
 1988 – did not make landfall.
 1989 – a powerful Category 5 typhoon mostly stayed at sea.
 1993 – shied away from land masses.
 2017 – Category 5 hurricane that struck the Leeward Islands, the Bahamas, Cuba, and Florida, causing 134 deaths and $77.16 billion in damage.

 Irna (1992) – stayed out at sea and crossed the basin as Jane.

 Irving
 1979 – struck South Korea.
 1982 – a mid-season tropical cyclone that affected the Philippines and China during September 1982.
 1985 – approached southern Vietnam.
 1989 – struck northern Vietnam.
 1992 – an early-season tropical cyclone that struck southern Japan during August 1992.
 1995 – a weak tropical stormmade landfall on the Leizhou Peninsula.
 2018 – a category 2 tropical cyclones, mostly stayed at sea.

 Irwin
 1981 – affected Southern Baja California as a tropical depression.
 1987 – affected the coast of Mexico; caused no damage.
 1993 – tropical storm that affected Mexico before being absorbed by Hurricane Hilary.
 1999 – affected Southern Mexico; caused minimal damage and no deaths.
 2005 – tropical storm that had no effect in land.
 2011 – caused no effect to land.
 2017 – Category 2 hurricane that had no effect on land.

 Isa
 1970 – formed near the Solomon Islands
 1997 – the first of a record eleven super typhoons to occur during the 1997.

 Isaac
 1982 – a powerful tropical cyclone struck Tonga.
 1988 – a disorganized tropical storm that moved through the Lesser Antilles, killing two people on Trinidad.
 2000 – long-lived Cape Verde hurricane that produced heavy surf along the east coast of the United States; the storm overturned a boat in Moriches Inlet near New York, killing one person.
 2006 – minimal hurricane that brushed Newfoundland.
 2012 – minimal hurricane that produced widespread flooding when it struck Louisiana, causing 41 deaths and $3.1 billion in damage.
 2018 – A Category 1 hurricane threatened the Lesser Antilles.

 Isabeau (1982) - designated as a tropical depression; possibly affected Madagascar (including Fort Dauphin) and Reunion with minimal impact. 
 Isabel
 1962 – a weak tropical cyclone that formed in the southeast of Madagascar and remained mostly at sea.
 1985 – the precursor caused deadly flooding and landslides in Puerto Rico, killing 180 people; as a minimal tropical storm it struck Florida.
 2003 – a long-lived Category 5 hurricane that later weakened and struck North Carolina, causing 51 deaths and $5.5 billion in damage.

 Isaias (2020) – minimal hurricane that struck the Dominican Republic, The Bahamas and East Coast of the United States, causing 18 death and $4,7 billion damage.

 Isang
 1964 – a category 1 typhoon that mostly stayed at sea.
 1968 – struck the southern islands of Kyūshū and Shikoku. Heavy flooding killed 25 people and left 2 missing.
 1972 – traveling north of the island of Taiwan before making landfall in China.
 1976 – did not threaten land.
 1980 – made landfall in the Philippines.
 1984 – a category 1 typhoon affected South Korea, Japan, and the Soviet Union during August 1984.
 1988 – a weak tropical storm hit eastern China as a 45 mph tropical storm. Torrential rains and heavy flooding resulted in 110 casualties and widespread damage to roads and dams.
 1992  – hit southeastern Taiwan, and on the 31st it hit China triggered devastating floods that killed 202 people and injured hundreds more.
 1996 – hit Japan caused heavy flooding, resulting in at least 2 deaths and moderate damage.
 2000 – the strongest tropical cyclone in the western Pacific during 2000 and wrought considerable damage in Taiwan and China in August of that year.
 2001 – one of the deadliest tropical cyclones to hit the island country of Taiwan, since 1961. 
 2005 – a strong tropical cyclone that passed over Taiwan on the night of August 31 to September 1, 2005, and over Southeast China on September 2.
 2009 – struck China.
 2013 – a weak tropical storm, with only a pressure of 1000 hectopascals and 45 mph, it formed and made landfall in the Philippines, especially Luzon, and China, as well as affecting Southern Taiwan during its nearby passage.
 2017 – a strong tropical cyclone that struck South China in August 2017.
 2021 – long-lived system which eventually affected the southern Japanese islands and hit the Korean Peninsula as a remnant low.

Iselle
 1984 – a Category 4 hurricane that passed along the coast of Mexico and only slightly affected 
 1990 – did not affect land. 
 2002 – a powerful tropical storm that had little impact on the California Peninsula.
 2008 – no threat to land.
 2014 – the strongest tropical cyclone to make landfall on the Big Island of Hawaii in recorded history.
 2020 – stayed in the open ocean.

Iseult (1970) – affected Mauritius.

 Isidore
 1984 – tropical storm that moved across the southeastern United States, killing one person near Orlando, Florida due to electrocution
 1990 – formed at an unusually low latitude, and traveled generally northward across the Atlantic Ocean without affecting land
 1996 – a major hurricane that formed and moved from the tropical to the northern Atlantic Ocean without affecting land
 2002 – a Category 3 hurricane that struck western Cuba and the Yucatán causing $330 million in damage and seven deaths.

 Ising
 1963 – struck northern Luzon in the Philippines as a Category 2 typhoon before entering the South China Sea where it made a second landfall in China
 1967 – heavy rains caused 69 fatalities and a further 32 people to be reported as missing.
 1971 – a weak tropical storm affected Philippines.
 1975 – struck Taiwan and China.
 1979 – Category 4 super typhoon, brushed Taiwan then struck southern China; subsequently restrengthened to a severe tropical storm in the Bay of Bengal.
 1983 – a deadly and destructive Category 5 super typhoon that hit Japan.
 1987 – made landfall on Luzon, Philippines, and later in northern Vietnam.
 1991 – affected Japan and South Korea.
 1995 – approached Luzon before curving out to sea
 1999 – killed 106 people in North and South Korea and caused US$657 million in damages

 Isis
 1973 – a storm made landfall in Northern Madagascar.
 1980 – never threatening land.
 1986 – never threatening land.
 1992 – never threatening land.
 1998 – a minimal hurricane that affected in Baja California Sur and Mexico killed 14 people.
 2004 – a category 1 hurricane that remained at sea and did not affect land.

 Ismael
 1983 – a minimal hurricane that brought heavy rainfall to western Mexico and the southwestern United States, killing four people and leaving $19 million in damage.
 1989 – long-lived major hurricane that killed three people in Colima, Mexico
 1995 – minimal hurricane that struck the Mexican state of Sinaloa, killing 116 people

 Isobel
 1974 – was no threat to land.
 1985 – did not affect land.
 1996 –  did not pass close to any land.
 2007 – made landfall along the north-west coast of Western Australia; its remnants merged with a deep low-pressure system and pummeled the region with torrential rains and high winds.

Issa (2022) – exacerbated catastrophic floodings in KwaZulu-Natal that killed 435 people.

 Ita (2014) – a 2014 severe tropical cyclone that struck the Solomon Islands, Queensland and affected Papua New Guinea causing 40 deaths.

 Itelle (1996) - powerful system that affected Madagascar shortly after dissipation, mostly stayed out at sea.

 Item
 1950 – struck a sparsely populated part of Veracruz
 1951 – moved slowly through the western Caribbean before striking Cuba as a tropical storm.

 Itseng (2004) - (As Oscar) crossed over to the South-west Indian Ocean; stayed out at sea.
 Iune (2015) - stayed out at sea throughout its life.

 Iva
 1961 – made landfall in Zihuatanejo, Mexico as a Category 1 hurricane.
 1968 – stayed out at sea.
 1972 – caused no impact to land while out at sea.
 1976 – a Category 4 hurricane that stayed out at sea; no possible impact.
 1978 – stayed out at sea; remnants produced rain in Hawaii.
 1982 – minimal tropical storm that caused no damage or deaths.
 1988 – Category 2 hurricane that stayed out at sea.

 Ivan
 1979 – remained over the open ocean.
1980 – formed from extratropical origin south of the Azores, and developed into a Category 2 hurricane while remaining away from land
 1997 – an intense tropical cyclone that existed simultaneously with another storm of the same intensity, Typhoon Joan, in October 1997.
 1998 – minimal hurricane that was one of four simultaneous hurricanes on September 26, along with Georges, Jeanne, and Karl
 2004 – long-lived Category 5 hurricane that moved through the Caribbean and Gulf of Mexico, causing 124 deaths and $26.1 billion in damage
 2008 – a powerful tropical cyclone that struck Madagascar in February 2008.

 Ivanoe (2014) - stayed out at sea

 Ivette
 2016 – made landfall east of Hawaii as a remnant low.
 2022 – did not affect land.

 Ivo
 2001 – tropical storm that brushed the west coast of Mexico.
 2007 – hurricane that brought heavy rainfall to Baja California.
 2013 – tropical storm that brought heavy rainfall to Baja California and California, causing one death.
 2019 – tropical storm west of Mexico.

 Ivor (1990) - affected Queensland, Australia as a Category 1 equivalent cyclone

 Ivy
 1952 – did not affect land.
 1956 – did not affect land.
 1960 – did not affect land.
 1962 – did not affect land.
 1965 – did a loop and only survived 5 days before dissipating.
 1966 – a powerful tropical cyclone that passed and only slightly affected Madagascar.
 1967 – did not affect land.
 1971 – spawned a multi vortex killer tornado that struck Omiya City while damaging many homes and buildings, the tornado killed 1 and injured 11 and it was rated as F3.
 1972 – did not affect land.
 1974 – struck Luzon and southeastern China.
 1976 – stayed at sea.
 1989 – stayed at sea.
 1991 – approached Japan.
 1994 (February) – stayed at sea.
 1994 (August) – stayed at sea.
 2004 – a tropical cyclone that affected about 25% of the population of Vanuatu in February 2004.

 Iwa (1982) – Category 1 hurricane that affected Hawaii (mainly Ni'ihau, Kaua'i, and O'ahu)

 Izilda (2009) - affected Madagascar (in close proximity), and Mozambique; however, it did not cause any damage to both areas.

See also

European windstorm names
Atlantic hurricane season
List of Pacific hurricane seasons
Tropical cyclone naming
South Atlantic tropical cyclone
Tropical cyclone

References

General

 
 
 
 
 
 
 
 
 
 
 
 
 
 
 
 
 

 
 
 
 
 

I